The 2021–22 Drexel Dragons women's basketball team represented Drexel University during the 2021–22 NCAA Division I women's basketball season. The Dragons, led by second-year head coach Amy Mallon, played their home games at the Daskalakis Athletic Center in Philadelphia, Pennsylvania as members of the Colonial Athletic Association.

Previous season

The Dragons finished the 2020–21 season 14–9,  8–6 in CAA play to finish tied for third place.  They defeated Delaware in the CAA tournament championship, and earned an automatic bid to the 2021 NCAA Division I women's basketball tournament.

Offseason

Departures

Incoming transfers

2021 recruiting class

Preseason 
In a poll of the league coaches, media relations directors, and media members at the CAA's media day, Drexel was picked to finish in first place in the CAA. Hannah Nihill and Keishana Washington were named to the preseason All-CAA first team.

Roster

Schedule and results

|-
!colspan=12 style=| Exhibition
|-

|-
!colspan=12 style=| Non-conference regular season
|-

|-
!colspan=12 style=| CAA regular season
|-

|-
!colspan=12 style=| CAA Tournament
|-

|-
!colspan=12 style=| WNIT

Awards
Brianne Borcky
Steven Sher Academic Award

Tessa Brugler
CAA All-Conference Second Team
City of Basketball Love All–City 6 First Team
CAA Player of the Week
Rebounding Award (team leader in rebounds)
Mo Cronin Spirit & Leadership Award

Maura Hendrixson
Lil Haas Coaches Award

Mariah Leonard
Charge Leader Award (team leader in charges drawn)

Amy Mallon
CAA Coach of the Year

Hannah Nihill
CAA All-Conference Second Team
CAA All-Defensive Team
City of Basketball Love All–City 6 Second Team
Preseason CAA All-Conference First Team
Meghan Creighton Assist Award (team leader in assists)
Team Defensive Player of the Year

Hetta Saatman
Steven Sher Academic Award

Jasmine Valentine
Liz Berry Most Improved Award (team's most improved player)

Keishana Washington
CAA All-Conference First Team
City of Basketball Love All–City 6 First Team
CAA Player of the Week (4)
CAA All-Tournament Team
CAA Scholar Athlete of the Year
Preseason CAA All-Conference First Team
Team Most Valuable Player
Steven Sher Academic Award

Rankings

See also
 2021–22 Drexel Dragons men's basketball team

References

Drexel Dragons women's basketball seasons
Drexel
Drexel
Drexel
Drexel